B Sides and C Sides is a compilation album by the American punk rock band Rancid. It was first released online on December 11, 2007, followed by a standard release on January 15, 2008. It contains a number of B-sides and rare songs as well as compilation or soundtrack appearances plus 4 previously unreleased songs. The set spans from 1992 to 2004, therefore it doesn't include any songs recorded with current drummer Branden Steineckert.

B Sides and C Sides is also notable as being the band's first release since their hiatus in 2004, along with their seventh album Let the Dominoes Fall, which was released on June 2, 2009.

Track listing

Personnel
 Tim Armstrong - vocals, guitar
 Lars Frederiksen - vocals, guitar
 Matt Freeman - vocals, bass
 Brett Reed - drums

References

Rancid (band) albums
B-side compilation albums
2007 compilation albums